Oecanthus californicus, the western tree cricket, is a species of tree cricket in the family Gryllidae. It is found in North America.

Subspecies
These two subspecies belong to the species Oecanthus californicus:
 Oecanthus californicus californicus Saussure, 1874
 Oecanthus californicus pictipennis Hebard, 1935

References

californicus
Orthoptera of North America
Insects described in 1874
Taxa named by Henri Louis Frédéric de Saussure
Articles created by Qbugbot